The 1984 NCAA Rifle Championships were contested at the fifth annual tournament to determine the team and individual national champions of NCAA co-ed collegiate rifle shooting in the United States. The championship was held at Murray State University in Murray, Kentucky. 

West Virginia, with a team score of 6,206, won their second consecutive, and second overall, team title, finishing 64 points ahead of East Tennessee State. The Mountaineers were coached by Olympian Edward Etzel. 

The individual champions were, for the smallbore rifle, Bob Broughton (West Virginia) and, for the air rifle, Pat Spurgin (Murray State).

Qualification
Since there is only one national collegiate championship for rifle shooting, all NCAA rifle programs (whether from Division I, Division II, or Division III) were eligible. A total of seven teams ultimately contested this championship.

Results
Scoring:  The championship consisted of 120 shots by each competitor in smallbore and 40 shots per competitor in air rifle.

Team title

Individual events

References

NCAA Rifle Championship
NCAA Rifle Championships
1984 in shooting sports
NCAA Rifle Championships